The 1967 Illinois State Redbirds football team represented Illinois State University as a member of the Interstate Intercollegiate Athletic Conference (IIAC) during the 1967 NCAA College Division football season. Led by third-year head coach Larry Bitcon, the Redbirds compiled an overall record of 8–2 with a mark of 2–1 in conference play, sharing the IIAC title with Central Michigan. Illinois State played home games at Hancock Stadium in Normal, Illinois.

Schedule

References

Illinois State
Illinois State Redbirds football seasons
Interstate Intercollegiate Athletic Conference football champion seasons
Illinois State Redbirds football